is a private medical university headquartered in Shirokane, Minato, Tokyo, Japan. 
The head of the university is on the Shirokane campus, neighboring the original Kitasato Institute, the first private medical research facility in Japan which was the starting point for the university in its present form. Kitasato University is ranked by Times Higher Education among the 350 best universities in Asia.

History
The school was named after Kitasato Shibasaburō. He was nominated for the Nobel Prize in Physiology or Medicine in 1901.

The 2015 Nobel Prize in Physiology or Medicine was awarded to Satoshi Ōmura, a professor at Kitasato University.

Organization

Undergraduate schools 
 School of Pharmacy
 School of Veterinary Medicine
 School of Medicine
 School of Marine Biosciences
 School of Nursing
 School of Science
 Department of Physics
 Department of Chemistry
 Department of Biological Sciences
 School of Allied Health Sciences
 Department of Health Science
 Department of Medical Laboratory Science
 Department of Medical Engineering and Technology
 Department of Rehabilitation
 College of Liberal Arts and Sciences

Graduate schools 
 Graduate School of Pharmaceutical Sciences
 Graduate School of Veterinary Sciences
 Graduate School of Marine Biosciences
 Graduate School of Nursing
 Graduate School of Science
 Graduate School of Medical Sciences
 Graduate School of Infection Control Sciences

Vocational schools 
 Kitasato Junior College of Health and Hygienic Sciences
 Kitasato Nursing School

Research institutes 
 Ōmura Satoshi Memorial Institute
 Oriental Medicine Research Center

Affiliated hospitals 
 Kitasato University Hospital
 Kitasato University Kitasato Institute Hospital
 Kitasato University Medical Center

Academics
Its major educational facilities are on the Sagamihara campus, 60 km west of central Tokyo. The departments include the School of Medicine, School of Allied Health Sciences, School of Pharmaceutical Studies, School of Veterinary Medicine and Animal Sciences, School of Marine Sciences, School of Nursing, and School of Science.

References

External links

 About Kitasato University School of Medicine
 Kitasato University (Japanese)

Universities and colleges in Tokyo
Private universities and colleges in Japan
Universities and colleges in Kanagawa Prefecture
Western Metropolitan Area University Association